The Climax Locomotive Works (formerly the Climax Manufacturing Company) was a manufacturer of Climax geared steam locomotives between 1888 and 1928. It was based in Corry, Pennsylvania.

In fiction
 Ferdinand is based on the Climax Locomotive Class in Thomas and Friends Misty Island Rescue. 

Defunct locomotive manufacturers of the United States
Industrial buildings and structures in Pennsylvania
Corry, Pennsylvania